Eigil Knutsen (born 21 October 1988) is a Norwegian politician for the Labour Party. He has served as an MP for Hordaland since 2017, and was previously a deputy member from 2013 to 2017.

Early life 
Knutsen was born on 21 October 1988 in Haugesund, Rogaland.

Knutsen studied at the University of Bergen from 2008 to 2013, graduating with a Master's degree in economics.

Career 
From 2015 to 2017, Knutsen worked as a political adviser to Bergen City Councillor Harald Schjelderup.

Parliament 
He served as a deputy representative to the Storting for Hordaland during the term 2013–2017.

Knutsen was elected as a representative to the Storting for Hordaland in the 2017 election. He was re-elected in 2021. He also became the chair of the Standing Committee on Finance and Economic Affairs. He also became the party's financial spokesperson.

Personal life 
Knutsen was on Utøya during the 2011 Utøya shootings, but succeeded in hiding from the shooter.

References

External links 

 
 

1988 births
Living people
People from Karmøy
Deputy members of the Storting
Labour Party (Norway) politicians
Politicians from Bergen
Survivors of the 2011 Norway attacks
21st-century Norwegian politicians